The Lanzhou–Zhengzhou–Changsha product oil pipeline is a pipeline carrying diesel and other oil products from the northwest to the central regions of China.  The  pipeline starts in Lanzhou in Gansu, and runs through Zhengzhou in Henan to Changsha in Hunan. In Zhengzhou, it is linked with Jinzhou–Zhengzhou product pipeline running from Jinzhou in Liaoning to Zhengzhou.

The pipeline project was approved in 2007. The Zhengzhou–Changsha segment is expected to be completed by the end of June 2010. The pipeline has an annual transportation capacity of 15 million tonnes. It is operated by PetroChina.

Yellow River oil spill

On 30 December 2009, due to the rupturing of a segment of the pipeline, there was an oil spill in China's Yellow River. Approximately  of diesel oil flowed down the Wei and Chishui Rivers before finally reaching the Yellow River on 4 January 2010.

See also

 Kazakhstan-China oil pipeline
 Alashankou–Dushanzi Crude Oil Pipeline

References

Energy infrastructure completed in 2009
Oil pipelines in China